The Sydney Australia Temple is the 30th constructed and 28th operating temple of the Church of Jesus Christ of Latter-day Saints (LDS Church).

Located in Carlingford, a suburb in Baulkham Hills Shire north of Sydney, Australia, this was the last of the temples built with the small single spire design.  The Apia Samoa, Nuku'alofa Tonga, and Santiago Chile temples all have the same basic design.

History
The Sydney Australia Temple was announced on 2 April 1980, and dedicated on 20 September 1984 by Gordon B. Hinckley. Due to a ruling by the local government, the temple was dedicated without a statue of the angel Moroni. The ruling was overturned about a year later, and the statue was hoisted into place atop the spire the next day, 3 September 1985.

In 2020, the Sydney Australia Temple was closed in response to the coronavirus pandemic.

See also

 Comparison of temples of The Church of Jesus Christ of Latter-day Saints
 List of temples of The Church of Jesus Christ of Latter-day Saints
 List of temples of The Church of Jesus Christ of Latter-day Saints by geographic region
 Temple architecture (Latter-day Saints)
 The Church of Jesus Christ of Latter-day Saints in Australia

Notes

External links
Sydney Australia Temple Official site
Sydney Australia Temple at ChurchofJesusChristTemples.org
  Sydney Australia Temple page

20th-century Latter Day Saint temples
Religious buildings and structures in Sydney
Religious buildings and structures completed in 1984
Temples (LDS Church) in Australia
1984 establishments in Australia
Christianity in New South Wales